Line 16 is a rapid transit line serving the south-eastern suburban areas of Shanghai. The line was formerly known as the Lingang line. It was originally designated as Line 21 and was planned as the south part of line 11. Construction begun in early 2009, and the line opened on 29 December 2013. The second phase was completed at the end of 2014.

Line 16 is susceptible to further speed limits due to heavy fog, due to the high operating speed of the line requiring longer sight distances. The line is colored aqua on system maps.

History
The new line was originally designated as Line 21. Shanghai Metro Authorities have since changed this to Line 16, and will integrate into the planned transport hub of Lingang city.

Stations

Service routes
Line 16 is the only line in the Shanghai Metro planned to feature different stopping services, with a rapid service stopping only at Longyang Road, Luoshan Road, Xinchang, Huinan, and Dishui Lake stations. Between 30 January 2014 and 21 March 2016, due to insufficient rolling stock and overcrowding of the line, all rapid services were suspended. To further increase capacity, the existing 3-car train sets were to be expanded to full 6-car sets and the rush hour headway was reduced to a minimum of 4 minutes and operated with a mixture of 3-car and 6-car trains. Since 1 October 2018, rapid service trains also stop at Lingang Avenue station at weekends and public holidays. Since 16 November 2018, rapid trains of weekdays stop at Lingang Avenue station. Express and Rapid train services started on 18 June 2020, With express services reducing end to end travel time to 34 minutes and Rapid services reducing end to end travel time to 46 minutes.

Important stations
The line has the unofficial nickname "excursion line" as it connects several scenic spots:  Xinchang Ancient Town, Shanghai Wildlife Park, Nanhui Taohua Village, Guzhong Garden, Shanghai Academy of Learning, Shanghai Flower Port, and Dishui Lake
 : Interchange station with Lines 2, 7 and 18, also interchange with Shanghai maglev train.
 : Haichang Ocean Park; buses to Shanghai Maritime University and Shanghai Ocean University.
 : Dishui Lake (largest artificial lake in China); China Maritime Museum and Shanghai Astronomy Museum.

Future expansion
The "China (Shanghai) Pilot Free Trade Zone Lingang New Area Territorial and Spatial Master Plan (2019-2035) (Draft for Review)" proposed that in the future, Line 16 will pass through the Dishui Lake and arrive at the future Nanhui New Town hub.

Headways 
<onlyinclude>
<onlyinclude>
<onlyinclude>
<onlyinclude>
<onlyinclude>
<onlyinclude>

Technology

Rolling Stock
Contrary to other A type trains with 5 doors on each side of a carriage, the Type A (city express) trains on Line 16 only have 3 doors due to the line's more suburban nature. The 16A01 series initially operated in 3 car formations, leading to huge overcrowding issues upon opening. The 16A01 series primarily have transverse seating to suit its more suburban role.  With the introduction of the 16A02 series, 16A01 series trains now operate in 3+3 car formations. The 16A02 series trains have more standing room and use more longitudinal seating, which will be able to take 200 more passengers than the 3+3 formation of 16A01. A six carriage train has a capacity of 2,378 passengers, 120% more than trains with three carriages. The tapering of the carbody between cars 3 and 4 where the "blind" cabs of the 3+3 set would be to match the dynamic envelope of a 3+3 set. The 16A02 series offer USB charging.

References

External links

Shanghai Metro lines
 
Railway lines opened in 2013
2013 establishments in China
1500 V DC railway electrification